Lyubov Ivanovna Misharina also spelt as Liubov Misharina (born 22 April 1986) is a Russian deaf cross-country skier. She married fellow cross-country skier Vladimir Mayorov after dating each other in 2010.

Career 
She made her debut appearance at the Winter Deaflympics representing Russia during the 2007 Winter Deaflympics and claimed four medals including a gold. She continued her medal success in the following Winter Deaflympics in 2015 which was held in her home country Russia claiming three silver medals.

She also represented Russia at the 2019 Winter Deaflympics and extended her Deaflympic career medal success clinching five medals including gold medals in mixed team sprint freestyle and sprint classic events.

Awards
In the 2020 edition of the national sports award Overcoming, in the nomination Sportswoman of the Year

References 

1986 births
Living people
Russian female cross-country skiers
Deaf skiers
Russian deaf people
Deaflympic gold medalists for Russia
Deaflympic silver medalists for Russia
Medalists at the 2007 Winter Deaflympics
Medalists at the 2015 Winter Deaflympics
Medalists at the 2019 Winter Deaflympics
Cross-country skiers at the 2007 Winter Deaflympics
Cross-country skiers at the 2015 Winter Deaflympics
Cross-country skiers at the 2019 Winter Deaflympics
People from Syktyvkar
Sportspeople from the Komi Republic
21st-century Russian women